The Western Australian Sports Star Award, currently known as The West Australian RAC Sports Star Award, is an annual award for sportspeople from the Australian state of Western Australia and/or playing for teams based in Western Australia.  It has been running since 1956.

The award has had several multiple winners. Cricketer Dennis Lillee won the award five times (1971, 1972, 1975, 1976, and 1981), and is the only person to win the award in consecutive years on two separate occasions. Another cricketer, Rod Marsh, was the second person to win the award four times (1972, 1973, 1974, and 1981), and is the only person to win the award in three consecutive years. Golfer Graham Marsh (1973, 1977, 1985, and 1986) and hockey player Ric Charlesworth (1976, 1979, 1986, and 1987) also won the award four times, while swimmer David Dickson (1961, 1963, and 1966) and tennis player Margaret Court (1969, 1970, and 1973) won the award three times.

Cricket has produced the most winners of the award, with 14 winners. Ten athletes and ten swimmers have won the award, as well as eight footballers, six cyclists, and six hockey players.

The most recent edition of the now titled RAC SportWest Awards were held at RAC Arena on Thursday 11 March 2021, delayed from 11 February due to a COVID-19 occurrence in Western Australia.  The 2020 winner - Jai Hindley - claimed a second-place finish at the 2020 Giro d'Italia in only his third Grand Tour start and in the midst of a global pandemic.

List of winners by year

List of winners by sport

See also
Western Australian Hall of Champions

References
WA Sports Star of the Year 1956 to 2005, The West Australian, 11 January 2006.

Sport in Western Australia
Australian sports trophies and awards
Awards established in 1956
1956 establishments in Australia
Lists of sportspeople from Western Australia